Alfrēds Verners (1912–31 December 1973) was a Latvian footballer and ice hockey player who played 10 matches for Latvia national football team in the 1920s.

Biography

Verners began playing both football and ice hockey with Union Riga (as it was a common practice among sportspeople in Latvia before World War II to compete in different sports in summer and winter). Verners got a wider popularity as in 1930 Union returned to the Latvian Higher League and unexpectedly earned a respectable fourth-place finish, and won the bronze medals just a year later. In ice hockey Union was an even stronger side, winning the first two Latvian league tournaments, thus by 1933 Verners was a two-time champion of Latvia in ice hockey and a one time bronze medallist in football.

On 30 June 1931 Verners made his international début for Latvia national football team scoring a goal and giving passes to two goals to Ēriks Pētersons. In total Verners made 19 appearances for Latvia until 1937 and scored five goals, he also played for the Latvia national ice hockey team. Verners joined Riga Vanderer in 1935 and won the Latvian Cup in 1936 and 1938.

References

1912 births
Latvian footballers
Latvia international footballers
Latvian ice hockey players
1973 deaths
Association footballers not categorized by position